The 1999 Torneo Godó was a men's tennis tournament played on Clay in Barcelona, Catalonia, Spain that was part of the Championship Series of the 1999 ATP Tour. It was the 47th edition of the tournament and was held from 12 April until 18 April 1999. Tenth-seeded Félix Mantilla won the singles title.

Finals

Singles

 Félix Mantilla defeated  Karim Alami, 7–6(7–2), 6–3, 6–3
 It was Mantilla's 1st title of the year and the 8th of his career.

Doubles

 Paul Haarhuis /  Yevgeny Kafelnikov defeated  Massimo Bertolini /  Cristian Brandi, 7–5, 6–3

References

External links
 ITF tournament edition details

Godo
Barcelona Open (tennis)
Godo